The Crusade to Free Cuba Committee was founded in December 1961 by anti-Castro Cuban exile Sergio Arcacha Smith to raise funds and support for the CIA-backed Cuban Revolutionary Council, a group formerly known as the Cuban Democratic Revolutionary Front.

References 

Opposition to Fidel Castro